Rakova is a village in the municipality of Čačak, Serbia. According to the 2011 census, the village has a population of 661 people. Rakova have river Čemernica, which Is full of beautiful nature. The name Rakova originated from the river Čemernica, because Čemernica had a lot of "rakova", or in English crayfish

References

Populated places in Moravica District